Karthi Gnanasegaram is a British television and radio presenter working for the BBC, Amazon Prime Video, Classic FM, Royal Opera House and Premier League Productions. 
As of 2011 she is a regular presenter on the BBC for sports programmes and on BBC One Ten o'clock News, BBC Breakfast, BBC Radio 5 Live, Chris Evans Breakfast Show and Today. She is also a presenter on Classic FM, Amazon Prime Video's tennis and football coverage and Premier League Productions.

Education 
She studied at King Edward VI High School for Girls, a public school in Edgbaston, Birmingham, followed by a Classics degree at Emmanuel College, University of Cambridge. Whilst at Cambridge she wrote for the student newspaper, Varsity, and played hockey, tennis and badminton (gaining blues in the latter two sports). She played both the violin and piano to Grade 8, and toured Europe playing the violin.

Career 
After working on BBC News and BBC Entertainment show, Liquid News, Gnanasegaram was a sports reporter and presenter at BBC London News.

She presented Sportsworld and StreetFood at Al Jazeera English in Doha before returning to the UK to present the news and sport for Sky News. Gnanasegaram returned to the BBC and was part of their presenting line-up at the 2012 Summer Olympics in London and presented a BBC1 highlights show during the 2014 Commonwealth Games in Glasgow.

She hosts Wimbledon tennis coverage on BBC Radio 5 Live and BBC Radio 5 Live Sports Extra and reports on matches. Gnanasegaram reports for BBC Sport on Match of the Day, Football Focus, Final Score and The Championships, Wimbledon. 

She is a regular presenter of the Today Sports Desk on Radio 4, and was involved in the shows guest edited by Lenny Henry and Sir Bradley Wiggins.

Gnanasegaram has appeared on BBC Radio 4's Woman's Hour.

She was part of the BBC Sport team at the 2016 Rio Olympics and Tokyo2020. She was a commentator at the Rio Olympic Park for BBC 5 Live and the Opening and Closing Ceremonies of the Tokyo2020 Games for Olympic Broadcasting Services.

In 2017 Gnanasegaram read the Classified Football Results on Sports Report, BBC Radio and BBC World Service becoming only the second female to do so after Charlotte Green.

In 2017, Gnanasegaram started presenting for Classic FM in their 25th anniversary year, and in 2018, she presented the Classic FM Sporting Music Countdown Show with Henry Blofeld and the series, Perfect Pitch in 2019, talking to sports stars such as Andy Murray, Shane Warne and Ian Wright about their favourite piece of classical music in 2019.
 The UK voted and chose Chariots of Fire as the nation's favourite piece of classical music related to sport.

Gnanasegaram is a presenter for IMG's coverage of the Premier League since 2010.

Since 2018, she has been a presenter for Amazon Prime's tennis and Premier League coverage and is courtside in New York at the US Open.

References

External links
Karthi Gnanasegaram on Classic FM

Year of birth missing (living people)
Living people
English television presenters
English people of South Asian descent
Alumni of Emmanuel College, Cambridge
Al Jazeera people
Tennis commentators